The PBS Satellite Service (also known as the PBS National Program Service, with the primary C-band feed being formerly known as PBS Schedule X in Eastern Time, with the West Coast delay signal designated PBS-XP) consists of feeds relayed from PBS by satellite to public television stations throughout the United States. The service was launched in September 1978. The service provides a mixed variety of programming selected from PBS's regular network services.  In the X/XP years a satellite feed was multicast by some PBS member stations on an over-the-air DTV sub-channel along with their regular programming, or during overnight hours on their main channel to provide a second opportunity for viewers to watch or record primetime programming. PBS currently utilizes two transponders on the AMC-21 satellite. Transponder 24 is a MCPC (multiple channel per carrier) which currently has seven channels uplinked from the PBS NOC (Network Operations Center) in Alexandria, VA. Transponder 23 utilizes four SCPC (Single channel per carrier) feeds which are shared amongst different affiliates across the country at various times. Currently, select stations broadcast the feed, usually overnight, like KGTF (PBS Guam, broadcasts most of the channel as a localised feed). The channel is also available over satellite providers like DirecTV (Channel 389). PBS stations provide all of their channels free to TV providers who do not receive local channels.

As of 2020, PBS's satellite feeds, as well as a few other PBS stations, can be received unscrambled using a free-to-air satellite receiver set to these coordinates:
 PBS at 125°W (on the AMC-21 satellite), Ku-band, unencrypted.
Montana PBS at 125°W (on the AMC-21 satellite), Ku-band, unencrypted.
 LPB at 87°W (on the SES-2 satellite), Ku-band, unencrypted.

PBS affiliate KETA, part of the Oklahoma Educational Television Authority (OETA), was also available on AMC 21 until June 2016. Their removal from satellite coincided with the completion of their transition to fiber distribution.

PBS transitioned to a fiber-based interconnection system known as sIX, otherwise known as the sixth generation of PBS's interconnection system, in July 2021. The original end date for the PBS Satellite Service was slated for 2016, but was later pushed to 2018, and was then pushed again to the beginning of 2021; none of these deadlines were met. PBS's feeds are still active as of January 2022, however, concerning PBS's three primary NPS distribution feeds (HD03, HD04, and HD05), the only programs airing on these feeds are news and public affairs programming; all other linear prefeeds have moved to sIX.

History

Starting in the early 1970s, PBS had been distributing programs via telephone lines from AT&T. According to PBS, the use of telephone lines to deliver programming was "incapable of producing high-fidelity sound," so they started to look for an alternate method of distributing via satellite. At the time, which was during the mid-1970s, PBS utilized what was knows as DATE (Digital Audio for TElevision) to transmit stereo audio; however, according to PBS, it was never widely adopted due to "high cost". In September 1978, PBS made programming available via satellite for the first time. PBS utilized four transponders on the Westar 1 satellite to deliver programing. In April 1988, PBS began encoding programs with VideoCipher II, which not only allowed for stereo audio (something PBS had been trying to accomplish since the 1970s), but also enabled multi-channel audio for services such as Descriptive Video Service or for a Secondary Audio Program. The feeds for PBS were usually broadcast in a "fixed key" mode (usually 0000), which allowed anyone with a VideoCipher II receiver to be able to receive these feeds. PBS would encrypt the feeds anytime they aired what they referred to as "private communications," which include teleconferences and previews of programs that they haven't yet received broadcast rights for. In 1994, with the launch of the Ku-Band feeds, PBS began encoding their feeds with DigiCipher I; PBS later switched to DigiCipher II in 1996. PBS made the switch to DVB-S MPEG-2 starting in 2006. In 2012, PBS began encoding their feeds in the DVB-S2 MPEG-4 codec. This is the current codec PBS uses for their feeds.

From 1978 until 1994, PBS distributed its content via C-Band (first on Westar 1 from September 1978-February 1982; Westar 4 from February 1982-January 3, 1991; Spacenet 1 from January 3, 1991 – July 18, 1992; and Spacenet 4 from July 18, 1992 – February 5, 1994). On February 5, 1994, which the launch of Telstar 401, PBS transitioned its primary feeds to Ku band. However, one C-band feed remained, which was the PBS-X feed. With the failure of Telstar 401 on January 11, 1997, PBS temporarily moved their feeds to Telstar 402R (later Telstar 4). In October 1997, PBS moved their feeds to AMC-3 (GE-3) at 87°W, where they resided until 2008, when the feeds moved to AMC-21 at 125°W, where they currently reside.

Transition away from satellite

In 2015, the Corporation for Public Broadcasting commissioned the help of Cognizant Technology Solutions to come up with a new cost-effective solution to improve the Public Television Interconnection System; the report was released in November 2015. Cognizant's recommendation was "that the system adopt a single interconnection system that is cloud-based, using mainly the public internet and an ecosystem of centralized master control service providers". This interconnection system is known as sIX ("six"), the official meaning being "Service Interconnection," according to Vigor Systems Inc., the company charged with developing and deploying the new interconnection system. It also represents the sixth major update to the interconnection system, the last occurring in 2005. Testing of sIX commenced in 2018. With initial tests proving successful, PBS discontinued their NRT (non-real-time) file-based transponder on AMC-21 in 2019. The goal is to move all linear-fed content to sIX in the near future.

The rollout of sIX is occurring in several phases. Phase 1 involved phasing out the NRT file-based Ku-band transponder. Phase 2 began in 2020 and is currently ongoing, which according to a May 2021 report from the Corporation for Public Broadcasting, "considers future options for the delivery of linear and live content." The report says that later stages will be "defined as business and technology needs evolve." The original plan was to transition the satellite feeds to the IEEE C-band spectrum starting in March 2016. This transition never occurred, and the plan was later abandoned.

In the last few years, PBS has begun to phase out a few of their satellite feeds. In 2016, PBS discontinued the SD01 Ku-band feed on AMC-21. On March 4, 2019, PBS's C-Band feed on SES 3 (103°W) was discontinued. As mentioned previously, PBS discontinued their NRT file-based transponder on AMC-21 in 2019. On November 13, 2019, PBS discontinued their SD07 Ku-band feed on AMC-21, which was uplinked from SCETV in Columbia, South Carolina. According to KNME (New Mexico PBS), "99% of Public Television Stations have successfully implemented sIX functionality". PBS, however, has expressed that they will continue to lease transponder space for live and near-live programs, such as PBS NewsHour; PBS will also continue to lease transponder space in the event their sIX system suddenly fails or experiences an outage. According to the website for the National Educational Telecommunications Association, or NETA, new programs distributed by NETA will no longer be fed via HD04 starting in July 2021; all programs will move to sIX only. American Public Television began to transition their programs to sIX in March 2021.

On July 3, 2021, all APT and NETA programs migrated to sIX, effectively ending their distribution via satellite. KNME's program uplinks on HD05 have also migrated to sIX, with the exception of Democracy Now!. PBS moved nearly all linear-fed non-news content to sIX in July 2021. Pledge program feeds were discontinued in August 2021.

PBS decommissioned the SD05 and SD06 feeds on July 21, 2021, at 2:56 p.m ET.

Channels

The channels currently available via Ku-band satellite on AMC-21 at 125°W are listed below (Lyngsat). All SCPC feeds are share amongst select affiliates.

 Montana PBS (this transponder is independent of PBS's other feeds)
 HD01 (PBS East)
 HD02 (PBS West)
 HD03 (NPS Feed)
 HD04 (NPS Feed, SCPC)
 HD05 (NPS Feed, SCPC)
 HD06 (PBS Kids Channel)
 SD02 (Create (TV network))
 SD04 (World (TV network))
 SD08 (FNX)

Discontinued Feeds:

 SD01 (NPS Feed) (December 9, 2008 - September 5, 2016)
 SD03 (V-me) (December 9, 2008 - March 2017)
 SD05 (NPS Feed, SCPC) (December 10, 2008 - July 21, 2021)
 SD06 (NPS Feed, SCPC) (December 10, 2008 - July 21, 2021)
 SD07 (NPS Feed, SCPC) (December 10, 2008 - November 13, 2019)

Scheduling

Throughout much of their history on satellite, PBS utilized four transponders corresponding to a different "Schedule," namely 'Schedule A,' 'Schedule B,' 'Schedule C,' and 'Schedule D'. Another feed, Schedule E, launched in 1988. Also starting around 1988, PBS would begin displaying an on-screen schedule on their feeds; this was in response to confusion and concerns from home dish users concerning schedule availability. PBS would later drop this practice starting around 1996. In 1995, PBS launched nine new feeds to replace the former A, B, C, D, and E feeds, namely: 5A0, 5A5, 5B0, 5B5, 5B6, 6, 7L, 7U, and 8. In 1997, PBS would rename their feeds with the prefix "50-" (Schedule 501, 502, etc.). There were five primary NPS feeds, Schedules 501–505, in addition to three SCPC feeds. Schedule 503 was reserved for PBS's Adult Learning Service, which launched on August 29, 1981, and was discontinued in September 2005. Schedule 503 was most active during academic semesters, mainly during the Fall semester (August–December) and Spring semester (January–May), though there would be occasional blockfeeds during the months of June and July. In addition to PBS programs produced for the ALS, programs from Annenberg/CPB were also fed on this feed. In 2004, PBS launched two HD feeds, DT2A and DT3A. DT2A was the national feed for the then-new PBS HD channel. DT3A was the primary HD softfeed channel that was used to feed HD content to stations, such as HD broadcasts of the PBS NewsHour (then known as The NewsHour with Jim Lehrer).

In December 2008, with the transition to HD, PBS launched new feeds that would phase out and consolidate some of their existing SD feeds. SD01-SD04 launched on December 9, 2008, HD04 and SD05-SD07 launched on December 10, 2008, and HD01-HD03 launched on December 21, 2008, all launching at 6:00 a.m Eastern. Programming on HD04 began on December 21, 2008. Programming on SD01 began on February 11, 2009. SD01, SD03, SD05, SD06, and SD07 are now defunct. DT2A and DT3A were discontinued on December 21, 2008, at 6:00 a.m. Schedules 500 (PBS-X), 501–504, and 540 (PBS-XP) were discontinued on February 11, 2009. In June 2013, PBS launched their HD05 feed. The newest feed to be launched by PBS was their HD06 feed in October 2016, airing only a test pattern. This feed was reserved for the PBS Kids channel, which launched in January 2017.

Current services

The PBS Satellite Service is freely and nationally available from the designated Ku-band broadcast satellites using free-to-air satellite dishes as small as 30 inches, though a bigger dish (at least 1 meter) is needed to receive the SCPC feeds. The three 'Schedule' feeds (HD03, HD04, HD05) broadcast different programs at various times throughout the day, with weekends and late night hours usually having no feeds. Some program feeds are only temporary and are usually not consistent. PBS would usually feed programs a few days to as long as a few weeks in advance. The former SD05 and SD06 feeds were rarely utilized, usually showing a test pattern for the whole day, though SD05 would occasionally show live feeds of major political events, such as confirmation hearings for new Supreme Court justices and, more recently, the entirety of the first and second impeachment trials of former President Donald Trump.

When no program is being fed, the channels will broadcast a slate displaying the name (e.g. Schedule HD03) and the time & date (both Eastern and Pacific time are shown).

HD03 is uplinked from the PBS NOC 24/7 and was the sole feed for PBS programs before the transition to sIX. This feed was also the primary feed for a majority of programs from APT until July 2021, when all APT programs moved to sIX. This feed mostly included soft feeds, pre-feeds, and until January 2020, promo reels (which have moved to PBS Source). Daily feeds on HD03 include East and West feeds of PBS NewsHour (including two feeds of PBS NewsHour Weekend during the weekend) and one feed of Amanpour & Company every weekday, as well as weekly feeds of select programs from DW, including Global 3000, In Good Shape, and Focus on Europe.

HD04 was utilized for affiliate uplinks and also included programs from the PBS NOC. This feed was the primary feed for NETA programming until July 2021, when all NETA programs moved to sIX. This feed was used solely for affiliate uplinks, with the exception of a few programs on HD05, usually from KNME. Daily feeds on HD04 include three feeds of BBC News programming (BBC World News, BBC World News Outside Source, and BBC World News America, with BBC World News Today airing weekly on Fridays), and six feeds of NHK Newsline originating from Connecticut Public Television.

HD05, like HD04, was occasionally uplinked from various sites as well as the PBS NOC. Pledge feeds were likely to be uplinked on this feed as well during pledge seasons until February 2021, when nearly all pledge feeds moved to HD03. Daily feeds on HD05 include two feeds of Democracy Now! (originating from KNME), two feeds from DW (DW News and The Day) and a late night feed of BBC World News. Weekly feeds include a feed of DW's Euromaxx on Tuesdays and a feed of White House Chronicle on Fridays. Other weekly feeds include a feed of Florida Crossroads on Monday and Capitol Update on Fridays and Saturdays (originating from WFSU), as well as two back-to-back feeds of Market to Market (originating from Iowa PBS). HD05 now serves as the feed reserved for live political events covered by the PBS NewsHour. These broadcasts were originally fed on SD05 until the feed was shut down on July 21, 2021.

Various videos of the service

 https://www.youtube.com/watch?v=phF2IsbBt84 (Schedule B, May 10, 1990; electronic programming guide showing a schedule for part of the current day's programs)
 https://www.youtube.com/watch?v=-S80WKV67sY (Schedule B, March 17, 1992; EPG showing the day's programs)
 https://www.youtube.com/watch?v=gTvdHsI3VzY (PBS-X, 1994; PBS ident with a schedule of programs and a looped text message reading, "On this transponder, you'll find programs from the PBS National Program Service and programs from other Public TV distributors as well.")
 https://www.youtube.com/watch?v=Y0peKirF1SI (PBS-X, 1995; 5-second ident saying, "You're watching PBS. Viewer supported public television.")
 https://www.youtube.com/watch?v=9K6YiPSEsvU (2001; During 9/11 The NewsHour With Jim Lehrer credits before PBS Kids)
 https://www.youtube.com/watch?v=MwiCfrngm-Q (HD01, 2018; PBS Promos before Mister Rogers' Neighborhood)
 https://www.youtube.com/watch?v=gE1mmx8US8A (Schedule SD01, July 1, 2016)
 https://www.youtube.com/watch?v=ps9w_Q8POfo (Schedule HD03, July 6, 2016; Test Pattern and slate before Charlie Rose; this is the current layout.)
 https://www.youtube.com/watch?v=JdhbQeb8L0A (Schedule HD05, August 31, 2020; Test pattern and slate before a pledge program, titled Ken Burns: The Civil War.)
 https://www.youtube.com/watch?v=7bdGQL4FPj4 (Schedule HD04, June 16, 2021; Test pattern and slate before BBC World News America.)

References

External links
PBS - Satellite Uplinks (pdf)
PBS - Director, Satellite Services 1994-1997

Public Broadcasting Service
Satellite television
Television networks in the United States
English-language television stations in the United States
Television channels and stations established in 1978